= Tutelary =

Tutelary may refer to:

- Relating to tutoring
- Tutelary deity, a deity or spirit who is a guardian, patron, or protector of a particular place, geographic feature, person, lineage, nation, culture, or occupation
- Patron saint, a saint who is regarded as the heavenly advocate of a nation, place, craft, activity, class, clan, family, or person
